The Schmidding SG 34 (109-533) was a German World War II-era solid-fuelled rocket motor. Four SG 34s were used on the Bachem Ba 349 Natter to provide extra thrust for launching.

Design and development
The Bachem Ba 349 Natter was originally designed with Schmidding SR 34 rocket boosters however these were upgraded to the more powerful 1,200kg thrust SG 34s in December of 1944. The SG 34 was manufactured by Schmidding Werke at the company's factory in Děčín located in the modern day Czech Republic.  

Four SG 34 solid fuel rocket boosters were fitted to the prototype Bachem Natter. The booter rockets were designed to augment the thrust from the Natter's single Walter HWK 509 engine and were most likely released by explosive shearing bolts shortly after takeoff.

References

Bachem aircraft
Aircraft rocket engines
JATO